500A may refer to:
Alfa Romeo 500A
Florida State Road 500A